Wendall Anschutz (January 21, 1938 – January 7, 2010) was a television journalist for KCTV in Kansas City, Missouri, from 1966 until he retired in 2001.

Anschutz was born in Russell, Kansas, and he was a first cousin to billionaire Philip Anschutz.

He received a bachelor's degree in speech and drama and later a master's degree, both from the University of Kansas.

In 1979, he began anchoring KCTV's evening newscast with Anne Peterson, and they were the dominant newscast team until 1994.

References

1938 births
2010 deaths
University of Kansas alumni
People from Russell, Kansas
Television anchors from Kansas City, Missouri